Jesse Lee Brinkley (born November 14, 1976) is an American professional boxer. He challenged once for the IBF Super Middleweight title in 2010.

Personal life
Brinkley comes from the town of Yerington, Nevada, where he is an active hunter and fisherman. He has been described by NBC as "the class clown". He lives with his longtime girlfriend and their two young children.

Boxing career
Brinkley disliked wearing headgear and hated the amateur point scoring system - so he turned professional quickly. His dream is to fight the legendary boxer Oscar De La Hoya.
He also has a tattoo which is of a scorpion.

In 2004, he entered reality tv show The Contender, and was placed on the West Coast Team. Having seen his teammate Gomez beat the highest-ranked boxer in the competition (Manfredo), he took on the second-highest ranked, Jonathan Reid, and won. His Quarter Final fight saw him having to lose a pounds in an hour to make the weight restriction against Anthony Bonsante, but he won anyway - getting into the semi-finals, albeit in a battered and bruised state. He lost his semi-final against the eventual winner Sergio Mora, and went on to lose the 3rd Place Fight to Alfonso Gomez in a good action fight.

On May 10, 2006 Brinkley fought the undefeated Joey Spina.  He was well in control of the fight when in the eleventh round he was hit with a devastating hard body shot and Brinkley crumbled into the corner the referee was forced to stop the fight.

In 2008, in a clash of former boxing TV reality contestants, he took on Otis Griffin, the winner of reality TV show The Next Great Champ on Fox.  Brinkley stopped Griffin in the 11th round at the Silver Legacy Reno in Reno, Nevada. Brinkley won the vacant WBC USNBC Super Middleweight title with the victory.

On February 14, 2009, Brinkley fought longtime rival Joey Gilbert at The Reno Events Center in Reno, NV. Brinkley scored a knockdown in the fifth round with a right cross that severely broke Gilbert's nose.  Gilbert spent most of the early portion of the fight trying to use movement to frustrate Brinkley, but did not add punches with that movement so Brinkley easily won most of the early rounds.  Later in the fight Gilbert started to hold his ground more and made the fight more competitive, but Brinkley still had the upper hand in most of their exchanges. Brinkley went on to win the match via a wide unanimous decision.

Brinkley fought Mike Paschall on July 10, 2009 and won by unanimous decision.

On January 29, 2010, Brinkley fought Curtis "Showtime" Stevens in Reno as part of ESPN2's Friday Night Fights.  The bout was an IBF Title Eliminator bout giving the winner an IBF ranking of No. 2.  Stevens claimed that Brinkley would not last fifty seconds in the ring with him beforehand, and started the fight aggressively, landing several hard hooks to Brinkley's face in the 1st round, causing swelling over Jesse's right eye very early, but Brinkley weathered the initial storm of Stevens, and outboxed/outfought him in an entertaining fight, dropping Stevens in the 6th and 12th rounds en route to a wide decision win, 117-109, 118-108, 119-107.

On October 15, 2010 Brinkley fought against the IBF Super Middleweight champion Lucian Bute in Montreal, Canada. Brinkley was knocked down twice in rounds five and eight before being stopped in the ninth round.

On April 29, 2011 Brinkley fought Peter Quillin in Reno, Nevada, for the vacant United States Boxing Organisation Super Middleweight Championship.  Brinkley lost by TKO in the third round.

Professional Titles
APBA West Coast Middleweight Title (2003)
WBC United States (USNBC) Super Middleweight Title (2006)

Professional boxing record

References

External links
Official website 
 

1976 births
Living people
Boxers from Nevada
The Contender (TV series) participants
American male boxers
People from Yerington, Nevada